The 1972 Louisville Cardinals football team represented the University of Louisville in the Missouri Valley Conference (MVC) during the 1972 NCAA University Division football season. In their fourth season and final season under head coach Lee Corso, the Cardinals compiled a 9–1 record (4–1 MVC, tied first), and were ranked eighteenth in the final AP Poll.

After the season in early January, he left for Indiana in the Big Ten Conference, and assistant T. W. Alley, age 30, was promoted to head coach.

Schedule

References

Louisville
Louisville Cardinals football seasons
Missouri Valley Conference football champion seasons
Louisville Cardinals football